Helen Aguirre Ferré (born 1957) is a Nicaraguan American journalist and the current executive director for the Republican Party of Florida. She previously served as Communications Director for Florida Governor Ron DeSantis. Aguirre Ferré was the Director for Strategic Communications and Public Affairs at the National Endowment for the Arts from August to December 2018 and the White House's Director of Media Affairs from January 2017 to August 2018. Prior to that, she hosted the public affairs program Issues on WPBT 2.

Career

Aguirre Ferré was an op-ed columnist for the Miami Herald. She hosted a Spanish-language talk radio show on Univision America until 2015.

Aguirre Ferré is a former Opinion Page Editor of Diario Las Americas.

Aguirre Ferré was the first female President of the 
District Board of Trustees of Miami Dade College. She declined to run for re-election as chair of MDC's board of trustees amid pressure from immigration activists. Ferré's decision came after local and national immigrant advocacy groups launched online petitions calling on her to step down from her chairmanship or resign from the board altogether, citing Donald Trump's "anti-Hispanic hate" and "anti-immigrant agenda." The college has a large immigrant student population. She remains on the board.

Aguirre Ferré was senior adviser to Jeb Bush's presidential campaign in 2016. In June 2016, Aguirre Ferré was named Hispanic communications director for the Republican Party.

Aguirre Ferré was named to the Florida Women's Hall of Fame in 2016.

Early criticism of candidate Donald Trump
Aguirre Ferré had initially been a harsh critic of candidate Donald Trump. "There's a side of Donald Trump that is anti-feminine. I'm not going to tell you he's a misogynist … but I do think there's something that bothers him about strong and independent women," she said in April 2016. "In the case of abortion, Donald Trump held every viewpoint possible … including supporting partial-birth abortion, something even many who are pro-choice oppose," she said of Trump the same month.

Trump "babbling more than usual," Aguirre Ferré tweeted during a Republican presidential debate on February 13, 2016. She criticized New Jersey Governor Chris Christie's and U.S. Senator Jeff Sessions' decision to endorse Trump, tweeting on February 29, 2016, "Wonder if Chris Christie and Senator Sessions now regret supporting Trump or do means justify the end? Telling either way." Following a violent protest at a Trump rally in Chicago, she blamed Trump for the violence, tweeting "Thank you! Ted Cruz and Marco Rubio agree that Trump bears responsibility for violence in Chicago today." On September 10, 2015, she tweeted that "women and country deserve better" than Trump.

Trump administration
On January 19, 2017, it was announced that she would be special assistant to President Trump and director of media affairs for the Trump administration. It was announced on August 9, 2018 that Aguirre Ferré "was taking up a new position as director for strategic communications and public affairs at the National Endowment for the Arts... in the next two weeks." In December 2019, Florida Governor-elect Ron DeSantis announced Ferré's appointment as director of communications.

Personal
Aguirre Ferré was born in Miami, to Nicaraguan parents. She is the daughter-in-law of former Miami mayor Maurice Ferré.

References

External links
 

1957 births
21st-century American women writers
21st-century American non-fiction writers
American women columnists
American politicians of Nicaraguan descent
Assistants to the President of the United States
Florida Republicans
Hispanic and Latino American people in television
Hispanic and Latino American writers
Living people
Trump administration personnel
Writers from Miami
Hispanic and Latino American women in politics
American women non-fiction writers
Journalists from Florida
Latino conservatism in the United States
Florida Women's Hall of Fame Inductees